Michael David Edmonson (born September 19, 1958) is the former superintendent of the Louisiana State Police, with service from January 2008 until March 24, 2017. Thus far, he is  the longest serving of the Louisiana state police superintendents. Edmonson was appointed by Republican Governor Bobby Jindal. Jindal's successor, Democrat John Bel Edwards, accepted Edmonson's letter of resignation after a dispute about troopers mishandling their expense accounts while at a conference in San Diego, California.

Background
Edmonson was a native of Alexandria, but attended Louisiana State University in Baton Rouge.

Edmonson was first married to the former Helen Owens, but divorced and married Suzanne Maglone Edmonson.

Law-enforcement career

In 2013 Edmonson received the Buford Pusser National Law Enforcement Award.

He also received the American Association of Motor Vehicle Administrators (AAMVA) Martha Irwin Award for Lifetime Achievement in Highway Safety.

Controversies

After his retirement, it was revealed that Edmonson and his family had lived rent-free in an official residence for more than nine years, apparently without authorization.  The benefit, valued at more than $400,000, may not have been reported to tax authorities. Other perks were also alleged, including chauffeuring of family and misuse of lodging in New Orleans during Mardi Gras.

Retirement in 2017
On March 22, 2017, Edwards appointed as Edmonson's interim (and later affirmed) successor Maj. Kevin Wayne Reeves, (born December 1968).

After he left the state police, Edmonson took a position in private industry.

References

 

1958 births
Living people
State cabinet secretaries of Louisiana
Louisiana Republicans
People from Alexandria, Louisiana
Politicians from Baton Rouge, Louisiana
Holy Savior Menard Central High School alumni
Louisiana State University alumni
American state police officers